Barry Hawkes (born 21 March 1938) is an English former footballer who played in the Football League as an inside forward for Luton Town, Darlington and Hartlepools United. He also played non-league football for Shotton Colliery Welfare, Bedford Town, Chelmsford City, St Neots Town and Horden Colliery Welfare.

His older brother Ken also played League football for Luton Town.

References

1938 births
Living people
Sportspeople from Easington, County Durham
Footballers from County Durham
English footballers
Association football inside forwards
Shotton Colliery Welfare F.C. players
Luton Town F.C. players
Darlington F.C. players
Hartlepool United F.C. players
Bedford Town F.C. players
Chelmsford City F.C. players
St Neots Town F.C. players
Darlington Town F.C. players
English Football League players
Southern Football League players